E or Wuse/Wusehua is a Tai–Chinese mixed language spoken primarily in Rongshui Miao Autonomous County, Guangxi, China. It contains features of both Tai and Chinese varieties, generally adopting Chinese vocabulary into Tai grammar. E is a tonal language—distinguishing between seven tones—and contains a few rare phonemes: voiceless versions of the more common nasal consonants and alveolar lateral approximant.

Etymology
The E language's unusual pinyin-transliterated name, which is also an autonym, consists of a single letter e. The character, which is written "诶" in Simplified Chinese and "誒" in Traditional Chinese, usually denotes an expression of affirmation. The language's speakers also refer to their language as Kjang E . Wusehua is a derogatory name for E.

Geographical distribution

In 1992, E was spoken by about 30,000 people, but by 2008 this number had dwindled to 9,000. Most E speakers are classified as Zhuang by the Chinese government. E speakers live in the Guangxi autonomous region of China, specifically in the Rongshui Miao county and border areas of Luocheng Mulao. Villages inhabited by E speakers include Xiatan, Simo, Xinglong, and the Yonglei district. E speakers' most commonly spoken other languages are Yue Chinese and the Guiliu variant of Southwestern Mandarin.

Phonology
E's consonant and vowel inventories are mostly similar to those of its parent languages. All are voiceless versions of consonants that, in most languages, are always voiced. E allows syllabic consonants and diphthongs.

Like most Southeast Asian languages, including Tai and the varieties of Chinese, E is tonal. The language is described as having seven tones, with the seventh varying allophonically with the length of the vowel it is attached to. With numbers ranging from 1 to 5, with 1 being the lowest tone and 5 the highest, the contours of the various tones in E are as follows.

Grammar and lexicon
E is usually classified as a mixed language deriving ultimately from the Tai-Kadai and Sino-Tibetan families, which both inhabit southern China and Southeast Asia. Some non-Chinese scholars, however, consider it a Tai-Kadai language with Chinese influence. Whatever its classification, the grammar resembles that of the Tai branch of Tai-Kadai. E's grammatical features appear to be a mix of Northern Zhuang, Mulam, and Kam. The Caolan language of Vietnam also displays many similarities with E.

The vocabulary, however, is mostly Chinese, based on Guiliu and the Tuguai variant of Pinghua. Out of the 2,000 most commonly used E words, only about 200 are of Tai-Kadai origin. E also inherits elements of these Chinese dialects' phonology and compound word formation. E morphology is primarily analytic, with concepts such as negation expressed with auxiliary words (pat6, m2) and no pronominal agreement.

In its pronouns, E distinguishes for person between first, second, and third; in number between singular and plural; and, in the case of the first-person plural, between inclusive and exclusive we. E does not, however, make distinctions for grammatical gender.

Notes

References

 
 
  
 
 
 
 

Analytic languages
Culture in Guangxi
Isolating languages
Languages of China
Liuzhou
Mixed languages
Tai languages
Tonal languages